Łukasz Kubot and Marcelo Melo were the defending champions, but lost in the semifinals to Dominic Inglot and Franko Škugor.

Inglot and Škugor went on to win the title, defeating Raven Klaasen and Michael Venus in the final, 7–6(7–3), 7–5.

Seeds

Draw

Draw

References
 Main Draw

Libéma Open - Men's Doubles
2018 Men's Doubles